Buffy the Vampire Slayer Season Eight is a comic book series published by Dark Horse Comics from 2007 to 2011. The series serves as a canonical continuation of the television series Buffy the Vampire Slayer, and follows the events of that show's final televised season. It is produced by Joss Whedon, who wrote or co-wrote three of the series arcs and several one-shot stories. The series was followed by Season Nine in 2011.

The series was originally supposed to consist of about 25 issues, but eventually expanded to a 40-issue run. The series also spawned a handful of spin-off titles, including a Tales of the Vampires follow-up and one-shots focusing on Willow and Riley.

The success of the series prompted IDW Publishing and Joss Whedon to publish a concurrent continuation of the Angel television series, titled Angel: After the Fall, and a Spike comic book series, which bridges some aspects of continuity between After the Fall and Season Eight. A motion comic version of the series debuted in 2010.

Plot
A year after the end of the television series, Buffy and Xander now lead command-central, which is situated at a citadel in Scotland. At their disposal are a wide array of psychics, seers, witches, and Slayers, along with a vast amount of technology, revealed to be the result of Buffy robbing a Swiss bank to acquire the funds. There are 1,800 Slayers worldwide according to Buffy, almost 500 of whom are working with the Scoobies, separated into 10 squads. Squads include Andrew's in Southern Italy, Giles' in England, Vi's in New York City, Robin's in Cleveland, Ohio, and another led by Rona in Chicago, Illinois. For Buffy's protection and because her name is feared worldwide, two decoys are put in place: one partying in Rome and one on a mission in demonic caverns. Buffy now relies heavily on Willow, whose character arc sees her under the tutelage of a powerful demon called Saga Vasuki. Under Saga Vasuki, Willow's power has grown phenomenally; for example, she can now fly and cast extremely complicated and large-scale spells.

In the wake of Sunnydale's destruction, elements within the U.S. government view the expanded Slayers and the Scooby Gang as international terrorists and characterize Buffy as a "charismatic, uncompromising and completely destructive" leader. General Voll, a member of a mystically aware Initiative-like government project, describes fear of their resources, power, and ideology. The government has teamed with Sunnydale survivor/powerful witch Amy Madison and Season 6 villain Warren Mears in the hopes of bringing Buffy down. Simultaneously, an evil British socialite Slayer called Lady Genevieve Savidge plots to usurp Buffy's place in the Slayer hierarchy, and a shrewd cabal of Japanese vampires scheme to reverse the global activation of Potential Slayers in "Chosen". The appearances of these villains are connected to "Twilight", the enigmatic Big Bad of the season, a masked person who views the expanded ranks of Slayers as a threat to humanity and wants to destroy them, and bring about an end to all magic on Earth. It later transpires that like Amy and Warren, Buffy's ex-boyfriend Riley Finn is also loyal to Twilight, though Riley turns out to have been Buffy's double agent.

Halfway through the season, ditzy vampire Harmony Kendall rises to fame as a reality TV star and ushers in a new pro-vampire, anti-Slayer world order. Under attack from Twilight and other demons as well as militaries across the world, the various Slayer squads (including Faith) reconvene in retreat from their enemy. Because Twilight can now track the group through their use of magic, Buffy and her friends relocate to Tibet to learn from Oz how to suppress magical natures for witches and Slayers alike. Giles and Buffy are both concerned with the extent to which they rely on Willow, worried she may go overboard again as in Season Six; Buffy's fears are in part justified by her visit to the future (a crossover with the Whedon miniseries Fray) where she was forced to kill a future Dark Willow. Following the fray with Twilight, in which many Slayers were killed, Buffy developed abilities similar to those of Twilight.

A subplot involves the repercussions of Dawn's college relationship with a boy named Kenny (described as a "thricewise"), whom she cheated on, losing her virginity to his roommate. Consequently, Dawn has been cursed with mystical transformations: first into a giant, then a centaur, and finally a living doll until she apologizes to Kenny and breaks the spell. Among the core group, Buffy is for a time romantically drawn to another woman: a Slayer named Satsu, and Xander to Slayer Renée; Willow's relationship with the core group is more estranged, while she protectively withholds Kennedy from her friends. Kennedy is unaware of the sexual aspect of Willow's relationship with Saga Vasuki. Giles and Buffy, at odds, stop speaking with one another. Giles works with Faith to prevent more Slayers from going rogue. Although Buffy comes to feel that her only compatible mate is Xander, and is upset to learn that he truly loves Dawn, she and Angel succumb to their desires for one another upon their reunion, though the extent to which they were in control of their actions is uncertain.

In the series' penultimate arc, Twilight is revealed to be Buffy's former lover, Angel. Angel attempts to explain that his Twilight persona was used to unify the anti-Slayer movement, thus limiting the potential destruction they could have caused working independently. His secondary goal was to push Buffy's development so that the two of them could reunite romantically and ascend to a higher plane of existence, itself called Twilight. However, whatever magical effect Angel was under seemed to wane after Buffy realised she was needed back on Earth to assist her friends as demons poured in from other dimensions to destroy the old universe. At the last moment, Buffy's other love, Spike, arrives in a futuristic ship to announce he has a solution to the problem at hand. In the final arc, "Last Gleaming", Spike's information leads them to the source both of magic and of Twilight's power, a mystical "seed" buried beneath Sunnydale. Giles plans to destroy it, but Twilight possesses Angel and compels him to kill Giles by snapping his neck. Distraught, Buffy smashes the seed herself. Twilight is stopped but magic is also removed from the universe. Though Slayers and vampires retain their powers, witches for example are left entirely powerless. Subsequently, Willow breaks up with Kennedy and Faith inherits Giles' estate and attempts to begin Angel's rehabilitation. A pariah in the community of Slayers and former witches, Buffy moves to San Francisco where she lives as a houseguest at Dawn and Xander's apartment, and resumes her former duties as Slayer: patrolling at night for vampires.

Writers and story arcs
Joss Whedon serves as "executive producer" for the series across every issue, giving his other writers notes on characterization, continuity and his overall concept as he would when overseeing Buffy as a television series. Whedon wrote the first story arc ("The Long Way Home", #1–4), the fourth ("Time of Your Life", #16–19), the final story arc ("Last Gleaming", #36–40), and several intermediary one-shot stories (#5, #10, #11, "Willow", and #31). Comic and television writer Brian K. Vaughan became the first guest writer on the series, writing the second story arc "No Future for You" (#6–9). While Vaughan was not a "Buffyverse" staff member, he was a fan of both series (particularly the character of Faith) and Joss Whedon himself was a fan of Vaughan's Marvel Comics series Runaways, on which he served as writer during the period Vaughan wrote "No Future for You." Former Buffy and Angel writer Drew Goddard wrote the series' third arc, "Wolves at the Gate" (#12–15). Goddard first became a Buffy writer in its final season, starting with the episode "Selfless" and finishing with the Angel episode "The Girl in Question", which itself obliquely hints at the life of Buffy post-season seven. Goddard went on to become a writer for the movie Cloverfield and acclaimed American dramas Lost and Alias (all working alongside producer J. J. Abrams) while also penning the story "Antique" for canonical Buffy comic book Tales of the Vampires, which he references in "Wolves at the Gate".

Film, comics and television writer-producer Jeph Loeb wrote issue #20 of the series ("After These Messages... We'll Be Right Back!". Loeb had previously been involved with Whedon in the conception of Buffy the Animated Series, which never came to be. Following Loeb are Buffyverse alumni Jane Espenson, Doug Petrie, Drew Z. Greenberg, and Steven S. DeKnight as well as comic book writer Jim Krueger, who each wrote an issue between issues #21 and #25 ("Predators and Prey"), which is a single arc told from a number of different perspectives. These one-shots follow the perspectives of Harmony (#21, Espenson), Satsu/Kennedy (#22, DeKnight), Buffy/Andrew (#23, Greenberg), Giles/Faith (#24, Krueger) and a Xander/Dawn issue which will also reveal more about Twilight (#25, Petrie). Jane Espenson returned for a five-issue arc involving the character of Oz for issues #26–30, titled "Retreat" and also wrote a one-shot about Riley. Joss Whedon returned to write two one-shots, "Willow: Goddesses and Monsters" and issue #31, "Turbulence". Brad Meltzer, author of several New York Times best-selling books and later both Identity Crisis and Justice League for DC Comics wrote the penultimate story arc of Season Eight, "Twilight", which is issues #32–35. Whedon himself resumes authorship for the final five issues (#36–40, "Last Gleaming") of the series, bringing Season Eight to an end.

Dark Horse Presents has also offered several short, canonical side stories to the mix. "Harmony Bites" by Espenson and Moline is a fictional episode of Harmony Kendall's television series, tying into issue #21. "Vampy Cat Play Friend" is a fictional television commercial tying in with issue #22, written by Steven S. DeKnight and illustrated by Camilla d'Errico. Joss Whedon teamed up with Jo Chen to produce "Always Darkest", a depiction of Buffy's terrible nightmares, and Espenson teamed up with Moline again to produce "Harmony Comes to the Nation", a fictional interview for The Colbert Report where Harmony lays out her ambitions, both tying in with Jane Espenson's "Retreat" arc. Jackie Kessler wrote "Tales of the Vampires: Carpe Noctem", a two-part ministory with the previously unseen characters Ash and Cyn, about the consequences of Harmony Kendall's television series from a vampire's point of view.

Publication

Issues

One-shots

Trade paperbacks
The issues were collected together into trade paperbacks:

Library editions

The series has been collected into four deluxe, oversized, hardcover editions under the title "Buffy The Vampire Slayer Season Eight Library Edition", each containing ten issues and extra features.

Motion comics
Fox Home Entertainment produced motion comics based on the first 19 issues of Season Eight. The first motion comic was released on Amazon Video on Demand and iTunes on July 19, 2010, with new motion comics being released every Monday. The Region-1 Blu-ray and DVD of the motion comic series was released on January 4, 2011, and includes limited edition Jo Chen packaging and a collectible reprint of Dark Horse Comic's first book in the series. The Region-2 DVD was released on October 3, 2011.

Reception
Initial reaction to Season Eight was generally positive, despite the switch in medium leading to comparison between the television series and the comic. Mathew Springer of The Comicbloc described the series as "very good ... and slightly strange." He praised Whedon's writing in the opening issue, claiming, "The humor, pop culture references and spot-on quirky characterizations are all on vibrant display," and looked forward to the direction the book was going in. However, he admitted that it was hard for him to accept the comic as canon, claiming "there’s something subtly undermining this effort simply because it’s a comic book and not on television." Mark Stoddard of Comix Nexus also approached the series "with some trepidation, unsure of whether there would be more great stories that really needed to be told, and wondering whether the magic of TV could be replicated in the medium of comics." TV Squad's Keith McDuffee expressed that reading Buffy as a comic book after seeing it on television for seven years was strange, but the new format was a good thing because, "You don't have ugly casting problems and the special effects budget isn't a concern at all." In a later review, he reaffirmed this opinion, stating, "Thank God for a medium that lets creativity go completely wild without budget worries."

Georges Jeanty's artwork received praise for being dynamic and true to the characters, rather than trying to appear photo-realistic. According to Mathew Springer, "He brings these people to life not as drawings of actors and actresses, but as fully realized comic book characters in their own right." Mark Stoddard complimented Whedon's choice of Jeanty for the book, saying, "His layouts and storytelling are clear, he handles the action sequences pretty well, and the character likenesses are excellent, retaining a sense of artistic individuality, rather than simply generating portraits or rehashing television stills." However, Keith McDuffee criticized Jeanty's work, feeling, "The cover images...are amazingly detailed and truly capture what we remember of the characters, but the inside pages have a bit to be desired." Richard George of IGN described Jeanty's work as bringing "a mixture of real life practicality and zany cartoons," but warned readers not to compare it to the "immaculate" covers by Jo Chen, explaining, "Do not expect the art inside to be what it is on the outside, and don't hold one against the other. Both styles have their place."

Reaction from original cast
Multiple cast members have commented on the appearances of the characters they originated for the TV series in the Season 8 comics.
 Sarah Michelle Gellar, who portrayed Buffy, was first informed of Buffy's lesbian experiences by Seth Green, who played Oz, in an on-camera interview, and expressed surprise and approval of the development.
 Nicholas Brendon, who portrayed Xander, mentioned the events of issue #12 in the Paley Center for Media Buffy cast reunion held March 20, 2008, to the obvious surprise of James Marsters and Sarah Michelle Gellar, later commenting, "He's looking good, rocking the eye patch in charge of 500 chicks. That is the one thing that Xander would be completely blown away about — being in charge of 500 slayers. Xander wasn't in charge of himself in the show!"
 Anthony Stewart Head, who played Rupert Giles, said, "I've seen bits of it and I'd love to see more because it's so cool. It's Joss — and I love Joss's writing. I haven’t had a lot of time but I must get the whole season and check it out."
 Elizabeth Anne Allen, who portrayed Amy, described the series as "awesome," saying, "[Season Six/Seven] was fun.... but I really would have loved to play Amy in Season 8. She is much darker."

Awards

References

External links

 
 
 Buffy the Vampire Slayer at Dark Horse Comics
 Joss Whedon Q&A about Season 8 at TVGuide.com
 The Comic Book Guide to Buffy the Vampire Slayer

2007 comics debuts
Season 08
Werewolf comics
Comics about magic
Season 08
Comics based on television series
Comics by Brad Meltzer
Eisner Award winners for Best New Series
LGBT-related comics
GLAAD Media Award for Outstanding Comic Book winners
Horror comics